Isaac P. Durfee (January 27, 1838 in Rhode Island – May 6, 1916 in Saint Paul, Minnesota) was a Minnesota State Senator in the 38th district. Durfee was born in Rhode Island in January 1838 and received at least an elementary school education from Rhode Island Common Schools. He moved to Minnesota in 1872 and served as a county commissioner for Nobles County until October 12, 1875. He was a farmer in Worthington, Minnesota when he was elected to the Minnesota State Senate on November 2, 1875. George S. Thompson won the election; however, Durfee contested the election and was given the seat. He served Cottonwood, Jackson, Martin, Murray, Nobles, Pipestone, Rock, and Watonwan counties for 2 years.  He was preceded by Everett P. Freeman and succeeded by Pierce J. Kniss.

References

1838 births
1916 deaths
People from Worthington, Minnesota
Minnesota state senators
County commissioners in Minnesota